The 2022 Ligai Olii Tojikiston (Tajik: 2022 Лигаи Олии Тоҷикистон),, or 2022 Tajikistan Higher League was the 31st season of the Tajikistan Higher League, Tajikistan's top division of association football.

Season events
On 28 January 2022, the Tajikistan Football Federation announced that for the upcoming season each club would be able to register 7 foreign players, with five being able to be on the pitch at the same time.

On 2 March 2022, the Tajikistan Football Federation announced that for the upcoming season will be a format change of the tournament, on the first stage the 10 teams will play each other twice (18 games per team). On the final stage there will be two groups, the Championship round will be played by the teams on position one to five of the first stage and the Relegation round will be played by the teams on position six to ten, both groups will play each other once (four games per team).

Teams
On 28 February, the Tajikistan Football Federation confirmed that 10 teams would take part in the 2022 season.

Personnel and sponsoring

Foreign players
Tajikistan Higher League clubs are allowed to register seven foreign players, with five being able to be on the pitch at the same time.

In bold: Players that have been capped for their national team.

Managerial changes

Regular season

League table

Results

Results by round

Championship round

Championship round table

Results

Results by round

Relegation round

Relegation round table

Results

Results by round

Season statistics

Scoring
 First goal of the season: Mbake Siyabatchu Deudoni for Istaravshan against Fayzkand.

Top scorers

Own goals:

Hat-tricks

Clean sheets

Awards

Monthly awards

References

External links
Football federation of Tajikistan

Tajikistan Higher League seasons
1
Tajik